Dino Štiglec (born 3 October 1990) is a Croatian professional footballer who plays as a left-back for Hapoel Haifa from the Israeli Premier League.

Club career
A product of the NK Zagreb academy, Štiglec made his debut in the finish of the 2008–09 Prva HNL season, coming in for Igor Jugović in the 85th minute on 1 March 2009 in an away win against Croatia Sesvete. He was sent subsequently on loans to Vrapče in the Treća HNL and Lučko in the Druga HNL.

On 9 January 2017, he signed for the Slovenian champions Olimpija Ljubljana.

References

External links
 
 HR Sport profile

1990 births
Living people
Footballers from Zagreb
Association football fullbacks
Croatian footballers
NK Zagreb players
NK Vrapče players
NK Lučko players
NK Slaven Belupo players
NK Olimpija Ljubljana (2005) players
Śląsk Wrocław players
Hapoel Haifa F.C. players
HNK Gorica players
Croatian Football League players
Second Football League (Croatia) players
First Football League (Croatia) players
Slovenian PrvaLiga players
Ekstraklasa players
Israeli Premier League players
Croatian expatriate footballers
Expatriate footballers in Slovenia
Expatriate footballers in Poland
Expatriate footballers in Israel
Croatian expatriate sportspeople in Slovenia
Croatian expatriate sportspeople in Poland
Croatian expatriate sportspeople in Israel